Vychodil is a surname. Notable people with the surname include:

David Vychodil (born 1980), Czech ice hockey player
Tomáš Vychodil (born 1975), Czech-Russian footballer and coach